Mahanadhi is a 1994 Indian Tamil-language crime drama film directed by Santhana Bharathi and co-written by Kamal Haasan. The film stars Haasan and Sukanya, with S. N. Lakshmi, Tulasi, Shobana, Dinesh, Poornam Viswanathan, Rajesh and V. M. C. Haneefa in supporting roles. It revolves around a widower and his family going through many miseries due to the machinations of a con artist.

The idea for Mahanadhi originated when Haasan discovered his domestic help's plan to kidnap his daughters for a ransom. After he completed the story, novelist Ra. Ki. Rangarajan made  inputs, and was subsequently credited as the dialogue writer. Cinematography was handled by newcomer M. S. Prabhu, and editing was handled by N. P. Sathish. It was the first film in India to make use of Avid Technology. The film deals with several issues such as corruption and child trafficking.

Mahanadhi was released in theatres on 14 January 1994, Pongal day, and was both critically and commercially successful. The film won two National Film Awards: Best Feature Film in Tamil and Best Audiography, and two Tamil Nadu State Film Awards: Special Prize (Best Film) and Best Stunt Coordinator (Vikram Dharma).

Plot 
Krishnaswamy is a widower living with his mother-in-law Saraswathi Ammal, daughter Kaveri and son Bharani in a village near Kumbakonam. Dhanush, a con artist from Madras, lusts for Krishna's prosperity and asks him to join his chit fund business. Krishna is initially reluctant; however, when a rich friend from abroad visits his house, he too wants to be rich like them. Hence he agrees to Dhanush's proposal and arrives at Madras, unaware of Dhanush's tricks. When Dhanush swindles the chit fund money, Krishna is implicated and wrongfully convicted.

Krishna finds that even his future father-in-law Panjapakesan is also in jail for the same reason, whose daughter is Yamuna, a nurse. He advises Krishna not to be angry if the jailor is cruel, as he might be released sooner if he is submissive in the jail. During Krishna's tenure in jail, Yamuna takes care of his family. Due to unavoidable situations, his mother-in-law dies, and his children go missing. Krishna learns this after coming out from jail suffering unnecessary hardships.

Krishna finds his son with street artists and gets him back. He later learns that his daughter is in Calcutta, at a red-light district called Sonagachi. When Krishna was arrested, Kaveri had attained puberty, and three months later, Saraswathi became sick. Kaveri and Bharani go to Dhanush asking for financial help. Dhanush takes them to his higher boss, so that the virgin Kaveri could sleep with him to get money. Though the boss provides money to Dhanush for Saraswathi's treatment, he chases out Bharani with his dog and keeps the money for himself. It is implied that Kaveri is raped by the boss and is child trafficked, ending up in Sonagachi.

Krishna goes to Calcutta with his father-in-law and tracks down his daughter. Unable to bear the grief, he grabs her and tries to escape, while the pimps there beat him severely. The elder sex-workers/madam make a truce and insist that Krishna take Kaveri, while they would work extra hours to pay the pimps for the loss of Kaveri.

After returning from Calcutta, Krishna wants to start a new life with Yamuna, but his friend in the police, Muthusamy tells him that Dhanush has planned to jail Krishna further by plotting a murder case against him, he would be arrested the next day. Also, Krishna overhears his daughter blabbering in her sleep not to rape her. He is heartbroken due to the state of his children, so he decides to curb the root of all sin and grief against Dhanush, and goes to seek revenge.

Krishna learns that Dhanush is just a pawn in the big game of cheating. He not only kills Dhanush, but also Venkatachalam, the main person who was behind this game; at the cost of his left arm. Krishna is sentenced to 14 years of imprisonment and comes out a contented man, to see his daughter married to Muthusamy's son and having a child, and his son being a grown-up man. The whole family moves back to their native village.

Cast 
 Kamal Haasan as Krishnaswamy
 Sukanya as Yamuna
 S. N. Lakshmi as Saraswathi Ammal
 Tulasi as Manju
 Shobana as Kaveri (young)
 Dinesh as Bharani
 Poornam Viswanathan as Panjabikesan
 Rajesh as Muthusamy
 V. M. C. Haneefa as Dhanush
 Mohan Natarajan as Venkatachalam
 Vijay as Mannangkatti

 Sivasankar as Thulukaanam
 Sangita as Kaveri (older, uncredited)

Production

Development 
According to Kamal Haasan, his domestic help plotted to kidnap his daughters for a ransom, but he discovered their plan. This incident laid the foundation for Mahanadhi. Haasan has stated that when he started to write the script, "the script wrote itself ....maybe assisted by my fear, apprehension and paranoia." He avoided publicising this fact for over twenty years. According to director Santhana Bharathi, when Haasan was asked to do a film for S. A. Rajkannu of Sree Amman Creations, he immediately involved Bharathi in the project and told him the story needed to be ready. Haasan and Bharathi went to Kodaikanal where they completed the story after much toiling. After the duo returned to Madras, novelist Ra. Ki. Rangarajan made further suggestions which were used; he was subsequently credited as the film's dialogue writer.

Haasan initially considered titling the film Meenda Sorgam (previously the title of a 1960 film), but ultimately desisted as it was found to be old-fashioned; Mahanadhi was later finalised as the team wanted a title related to rivers, with many of the characters being named after rivers. P. C. Sreeram was initially approached to be the cinematographer, but he declined and instead suggested his assistant M. S. Prabhu. The film was Prabhu's first as an independent cinematographer while the fight sequences were choreographed by Vikram Dharma. Haasan's then-wife Sarika designed the costumes and was also an audiographer, while editing was handled by N. P. Sathish. Cheran worked as an associate director, but left the project midway due to "creative differences" with Haasan.

Casting and filming 
The film marked the acting debut of Shobana (who did not act in any other film since then), Dinesh and Sivasankar, who all got the film's title added to their names as a prefix. The makers wanted a girl who could sing well, and cast Shobana as Kaveri after discovering her at a school event. Sivasankar, who became known as "Mahanadhi" Shankar, was cast as the prison warden Thulukaanam as the makers wanted someone who could perform stunts as well as act. He was already a stuntman, and was recommended to Bharathi by Dharma. V. M. C. Haneefa readily agreed to act in the film as Dhanush when approached; he had previously been considered for an antagonistic role in Bharathi's Gunaa (1991). The sex workers in Sonagachi were not portrayed by real sex workers, but extras. The woman reuniting Krishnaswamy with his daughter was played by a bank officer then associated with the Tamil sangam theatre troupe.

Principal photography was to have begun in May 1993, but began only in September due to casting difficulties; Bharathi said the makers "had to reach for three boys belonging to different age groups and son resembling Kamal [Haasan] and three girls likewise to play Kamal's daughters". The prison scenes were shot on a set designed by art director G. K., and some of the vessels used for those scenes were borrowed from real prisons. The pre-interval scene where Krishnaswamy stands victoriously in prison as the saviour of people has been dubbed the "Jesus Christ" shot due to the way the light falls on Krishnaswamy. Mahanadhi was the first film in India to make use of Avid Technology, and was one of the first digitally edited films outside of the United States.

Themes 
Mahanadhi deals with several issues such as corruption and child trafficking. Baradwaj Rangan said: "Mahanadhi is one of the saddest films ever made, grim north to Singin' in the Rain blithe south, but it has an extraordinary musical moment in 'Peygala nambaadhey', which Kamal Haasan's character sings, during a power cut, to his children who are scared of the dark". He described the song as "(a) a father's moral instruction to his children ("face your fears"), (b) a bit of levity, (c) a sweet stretch showcasing this family's dynamics, and (d) a hint that bad things can come at you from everywhere, whether from the television set (featuring terrifyingly distorted musical performers) or even a doting grandmother (who, jokingly, fashions herself into a demon goddess). That's where the film is headed, into a zone where nothing and no one can be trusted, and this song shapes these themes in a casually understated manner".

Poet Puviarasu stated: "Don't go after the mystic deer, was Kamal's message in the movie Mahanadhi [...] In the film, Krishna relocates to the city to earn more money, own a Benz and educate his daughter at Church Park Convent. And he faces the consequences of his actions." The film also symbolically references the Kaveri River water dispute, and many of the characters are named after major Indian rivers like Krishna (Krishnaswamy), Yamuna, Kaveri, Thamirabarani (Bharani) and Narmada (Krishnaswamy's late wife). Haasan has stated that the central message of Mahanadhi is that "urbanisation is not necessarily development". He also said the film was influenced by Les Misérables, an 1862 novel by Victor Hugo. The core plot was also reported to bear resemblance with the 1979 film Hardcore.

Soundtrack 
The music was composed by Ilaiyaraaja, and lyrics were written by Vaali. Shobana sang the song "Sri Ranga Ranganathanin", which is set in Hamsadhvani raga.

Release 
Mahanadi was released in theatres on 14 January 1994, Pongal day. Despite clashing against other Pongal releases such as Sethupathi IPS, Amaidhi Padai, Rajakumaran, Veetla Visheshanga, Siragadikka Aasai and Sindhu Nathi Poo, it became a box office success. In September 2020, Rajesh, who played a supporting role in the film, told Nakkheeran that the successful box office run and profits made by Mahanadhi helped Rajkannu clear all his earlier debts and it was he who requested Haasan to make the film for Rajkannu. The film was screened at the International Film Festival Rotterdam six years after its release.

Reception 
Malini Mannath of The Indian Express wrote, "Mahanadhi is a melancholic film with scenes that linger long after the film is over." K. Vijiyan of New Straits Times wrote, "This movie is quite long [...] and I was warned the story was a bit "slow" but I did not really feel the time passing. If you like Kamal, you will like Mahanadhi, which should earn another acting award for him". The Tamil magazine Ananda Vikatan wrote that it is surprising to see such a soft, intense and different film in Tamil, and also praised Haasan's acting, stating that one will forget Haasan and see only the character Krishnaswamy and empathise with him. R. P. R. of Kalki wrote that, despite the presence of many actors performing well, Haasan was able to outshine them.

Accolades

Legacy 
Mahanadhi has often been cited as one of the saddest and most depressing films from Tamil cinema. Following the film's release, many people mimicked Poornam Viswanathan's style of dialogue delivery in the film. On the centenary of Indian cinema in April 2013, Forbes India included Haasan's performance in the film on its list, "25 Greatest Acting Performances of Indian Cinema".

References

Bibliography

External links 
 

1990s Tamil-language films
1994 crime drama films
1994 films
Best Tamil Feature Film National Film Award winners
Films about human trafficking in India
Films about miscarriage of justice
Films about police brutality
Films about prostitution in India
Films directed by Santhana Bharathi
Films scored by Ilaiyaraaja
Films shot in Tiruchirappalli
Films that won the Best Audiography National Film Award
Films with screenplays by Kamal Haasan
Indian crime drama films
Indian films about revenge